Olaf Bjarne Paulson (born 22 July 1940 in Copenhagen, Denmark) is a Danish neuroscientist. 

Holding an MD (1966) and DMSc (1970) at Copenhagen University, he worked in collaboration with Niels A. Lassen. His research focused on the physiology and pathophysiology of the cerebral circulation and metabolism. In the 1990s the research moved into positron emission tomography (PET) and magnetic resonance (MR). Former Chairman at the Neurology Department at Rigshospitalet (1979-94), he was establisher and leader of the Neurobiology Research Unit in 1995. He is leading the Magnetic Resonance center at Hvidovre Hospital, Copenhagen and the chairman of the Danish Neurological Society.

References 

1940 births
Living people
Danish neurologists